Infarto (Spanish for heart attack) is a hidden camera show on Azteca 13 in Mexico and Azteca América in the United States. People appearing on the show have been subjected to pranks such as the victim believing that they will be sacrificed in a cult ritual or believing that they will be murdered by axe-wielding neighbors in the midst of a blackout. Because of the extreme and traumatizing nature of the show's content, the authenticity of the show is heavily debated. Sci-Fi Channel's original show, Scare Tactics is modeled after this concept.

Pop culture

The American television show The Soup, known for its lampooning week-in-review of celebrity and television stories, began airing short clips of Infarto since July 2006, mainly to mock the deep, menacing voice which utters "Infarto" when the show's title logo is displayed. This may, in part, be because "Infarto" contains the word "fart" and is therefore amusing to English-speakers. The Soup host Joel McHale has called Infarto "the most evil practical-joke show in the world".
Late night television show Jimmy Kimmel Live! aired a clip of the show featuring a knife-wielding old man.

External links
 

Azteca Uno original programming
2005 Mexican television series debuts
Hidden camera television series